On Wikipedia, vandalism is editing the project in an intentionally disruptive or malicious manner. Vandalism includes any addition, removal, or modification that is intentionally humorous, nonsensical, a hoax, offensive, libelous or degrading in any way.

Throughout its history, Wikipedia has struggled to maintain a balance between allowing the freedom of open editing and protecting the accuracy of its information when false information can be potentially damaging to its subjects. Vandalism is easy to commit on Wikipedia because anyone can edit the site, with the exception of protected pages (which, depending on the level of protection, can only be edited by users with certain privileges). Certain Wikipedia bots are capable of detecting and removing vandalism faster than any human editor could.

It is not a criminal act to vandalize Wikipedia. However, it is against the site's terms of use to vandalize or otherwise cause disruption. Vandals are blocked from editing, and may also be further banned according to the terms of use. Vandalism can be committed by either guest editors (IP addresses) or those with registered accounts. To combat inappropriate user edits, Wikipedia has instated a protection policy, serving as a user-privilege merit system. For example, a semi-protected or fully protected page can be edited only by accounts that meet certain account age and activity thresholds or administrators respectively. Frequent targets of vandalism include articles on trending and controversial topics, celebrities, and current events. In some cases, people have been falsely reported as having died. This has notably happened to United States Senators Ted Kennedy and Robert Byrd, and American rapper Kanye West.

Prevention 

There are various measures taken by Wikipedia to prevent or reduce the amount of vandalism. These include:
 Using Wikipedia's history functionality, which retains all prior versions of an article, restoring the article to the last version before the vandalism occurred; this is called reverting vandalism. The majority of vandalism on Wikipedia is reverted quickly. There are various ways in which the vandalism gets detected so it can be reverted:
Bots: In some cases, the vandalism is automatically detected and reverted by a Wikipedia bot. The vandal is always warned with no human intervention.
 Recent changes patrol: Wikipedia has a special page that lists all the most recent changes. Some editors will monitor these changes for possible vandalism.
 Watchlists: Any registered user can watch a page that they have created or edited or that they otherwise have an interest in. This functionality also enables users to monitor a page for vandalism.
 Incidental discovery: Any reader who comes across vandalism by chance can revert it. In 2008, it was reported that the rarity of such incidental discovery indicated the efficacy of the other methods of vandalism removal.
 Protecting articles so only established users, or in some cases, only administrators can edit them. Semi-protected articles are those that can be edited only by those with an account that is autoconfirmed (at least four days old with at least ten edits). Fully protected articles are those that can be edited only by administrators. Protection is generally instituted after one or more editors make a request on a special page for that purpose. An administrator familiar with the protection guidelines chooses whether or not to fulfill this request based on the guidelines.
 Blocking and banning those who have repeatedly committed acts of vandalism from editing for a period of time or in some cases, indefinitely. Vandals are not blocked as an act of punishmentthe purpose of the block is simply to prevent further damage.
 The "abuse filter" extension, which uses regular expressions to detect common vandalism terms.
Editors are generally warned before being blocked. Wikipedia employs a 5-stage warning process leading up to a block. This includes:
The first warning "assumes good faith" and takes a relaxed approach to the user. (in some cases, this level can be skipped if the editor assumes the user is acting in bad faith).
The second warning does not assume any faith and is an actual warning (in some cases, this level may also be skipped).
The third warning assumes bad faith and is the first to warn the user that continued vandalism may result in a block.
The fourth warning is a final warning, stating that any future acts of vandalism will result in a block.
After this, other users may place additional warnings, though only administrators can carry out the block.

In 2005, the English Wikipedia started to require those who create new articles to have a registered account in an effort to fight vandalism. This occurred after inaccurate information was added to Wikipedia in which a journalist was accused of taking part in Kennedy's assassination.

Wikipedia has experimented with systems in which edits to some articles, especially those of living people, are delayed until it can be reviewed and determined that they are not vandalism, and in some cases, that a source to verify accuracy is provided. This is in an effort to prevent inaccurate and potentially damaging information about living people from appearing on the site.

ClueBot NG 

The most well-known "bot" that fights vandalism is ClueBot NG. The bot was created by Wikipedia users Christopher Breneman and Cobi Carter in 2010 (succeeding the original ClueBot created in 2007; NG stands for Next Generation) and uses machine learning and Bayesian statistics to determine if an edit is vandalism.

While the bot has been effective in helping keep Wikipedia clean, some claim the bot is hostile to new users by not being able to apply a human brain's knowledge to the edit, and leaving impersonal .

Blacklisting 

The MediaWiki title blacklist extension prevents page move vandalism and creation vandalism by using regular expressions to identify bad titles. Titles on the blacklist can only be created by or moved to by administrators. Pages that are also created repeatedly can be protected to prevent vandals from recreating bad pages.

In addition to the title blacklist, the spam blacklist prevents external link spamming, a form of vandalism. New/unregistered users who want to add external links are required to answer a CAPTCHA.

The "bad image list" prevents images that could be used to vandalize pages from being inserted, such as images with sexual content. Images on the list can be added only to pages where the use of the image is explicitly allowed.

The entirety of the MediaWiki namespace, the main page, and high-risk templates are protected to prevent high server load and sudden interface changes.

The edit filter can also prevent vandalism by disallowing the bad edit altogether, or by allowing only autoconfirmed users or administrators to perform the edit.

Notable acts of vandalism

Seigenthaler incident 

In May 2005, a user edited the biographical article about John Seigenthaler, Sr. so that it contained several false and defamatory statements. The inaccurate claims went unnoticed between May and September 2005, after which they were discovered by Victor S. Johnson, Jr., a friend of Seigenthaler. Wikipedia content is often mirrored at sites such as Answers.com, which means that incorrect information can be replicated alongside correct information through a number of websites. Such information can develop a misleading air of authority because of its presence at such sites:

Stephen Colbert 

Comedian Stephen Colbert made repeated references to Wikipedia on his TV show The Colbert Report, frequently suggesting on-air that his viewers vandalize selected pages. These instances include the following:
 On a 2006 episode of his show, Colbert suggested viewers vandalize the article "Elephant". This resulted in his Wikipedia account named "Stephencolbert" being blocked from editing, as well as many elephant-related articles being protected.
 On 7 August 2012, Colbert suggested that his viewers go to pages for possible 2012 U.S. Republican vice-presidential candidates, such as the Tim Pawlenty and Rob Portman articles, and edit them many times. This was in response to a Fox News hypothesis that mass editing of the Sarah Palin page the day before she was announced as John McCain's running mate could help predict who would be chosen as Mitt Romney's running mate in the 2012 election. After Colbert's request and his viewers' subsequent actions, all these articles were put under  by Wikipedia administrators, with editing restricted to established users.

Hillsborough disaster vandalism 

In April 2014, the Liverpool Echo reported that computers on an intranet used by the British government had been used to post offensive remarks about the Hillsborough disaster on Wikipedia pages relating to the subject. The government announced that it would launch an inquiry into the reports. Following the allegations, The Daily Telegraph reported that government computers appeared to have been used to vandalize a number of other articles, often adding insulting remarks to biographical articles, and in one case falsely reporting a death.

Political vandalism 

Politicians are a common target of vandalism on Wikipedia. The article on Donald Trump was replaced with a single sentence critical of him in July 2015, and in November 2018, the lead picture on the page was replaced with an image of a penis, causing Apple's virtual assistant Siri to briefly include this image in answers to queries about the subject. Both Hillary and Bill Clinton's Wikipedia pages were vandalized in October 2016 by a member of the Internet trolling group Gay Nigger Association of America adding pornographic images to their articles. That same month, New York Assembly candidate Jim Tedisco's Wikipedia page was modified to say that he had "never been part of the majority", and "is considered by many to be a total failure". Tedisco expressed dismay at the changes to his page. On 24 July 2018, Utah senator Orrin Hatch posted humorous tweets after Google claimed that he had died on 11 September 2017, with the error being traced back to an edit to his Wikipedia article. Similarly, vandalism of the California Republican Party's Wikipedia page caused Google's information bar to list Nazism as one of the party's primary ideologies. 

The week of 29 January 2017 saw various acts of Wikipedia vandalism that attracted media attention. White House Press Secretary Sean Spicer's Wikipedia page was vandalized and his picture replaced with that of Baghdad Bob, Dana J. Boente's page description was edited to read that he was "the newest sock puppet for the Trump Administration", and Paul Ryan's picture was added to a list of invertebrates, with the edit summary stating that he was added due to his lack of a spine.

On 27 September 2018, the personal information of United States senators Lindsey Graham, Mike Lee, and Orrin Hatch were added to their respective Wikipedia articles during the hearing of Supreme Court Nominee Judge Brett Kavanaugh. The information included their home addresses and phone numbers, and originated from the network located from within the United States House of Representatives. The edits were removed from Wikipedia and hidden from public view shortly afterwards. These edits were captured and automatically posted publicly to Twitter by an automated account. Twitter shortly removed the posts and suspended the account in response to the incident. An internal police investigation located the person who made the edits, and 27-year-old Jackson A. Cosko (a staffer for Congress paid by an outside institution) was arrested and charged with multiple felony crimes relating to the incident. Cosko was sentenced in 2019 to four years in prison after pleading guilty to five felonies.

Miscellaneous 
 A vandal called "Willy on Wheels" moved thousands of articles so that their titles ended with "on wheels".
 In 2006, Rolling Stone printed a story about Halle Berry based on false information from Wikipedia, which had arisen from an act of Wikipedia vandalism.
 In February 2007, professional golfer Fuzzy Zoeller sued a Miami company whose IP-based edits to the Wikipedia site included negative information about him.
 In August 2007, local media from the Netherlands reported that several IP addresses from Nederlandse Publieke Omroep had been blocked from Wikipedia for adding "false and defamatory" information to pages. A similar incident occurred with the Minister of the Interior in France in January 2016.
 In May 2012, media critic Anita Sarkeesian created a Kickstarter project, intending to raise money to make a series of videos exploring sexism in digital gaming culture. The idea evoked a hostile response, which included repeated vandalism of Sarkeesian's Wikipedia article with pornographic imagery, defamatory statements, and threats of sexual violence. More than 12 IP addresses from unregistered editors contributed to the ongoing vandalism campaign before editing privileges were revoked for the page.
 In May 2012, webcomic and humor website The Oatmeal published a comic in which it is suggested that Thomas Edison should be added as an example to the disambiguation page "". After having Edison added and removed several times, the page was extended-confirmed protected.
 In November 2012, the Leveson reportpublished in the UK by Lord Justice Levesonincorrectly listed a "Brett Straub" as one of the founders of The Independent newspaper. The name originated from one of the several erroneous edits by one of Straub's friends as a prank to Wikipedia by falsely including his name in several articles across the site. The name's inclusion in the report suggested that part of the report relating to that newspaper had been cut and pasted from Wikipedia without a proper check of the sources. The Straub issue was also humorously referenced in broadcasts of BBC entertainment current affairs TV program Have I Got News for You (and extended edition Have I Got a Bit More News for You), with The Economist also making passing comment on the issue: "The Leveson report... Parts of it are a scissors-and-paste job culled from Wikipedia."
 In April 2015, The Washington Post reported on an experiment by "Gregory Kohs, a former editor, and prominent Wikipedia critic": "Kohs wrapped up an experiment in which he inserted outlandish errors into 31 articles and tracked whether editors ever found them. After more than two months, half of his hoaxes still had not been foundand those included errors on high-profile pages, like "" and "". (By his estimate, more than 100,000 people have now seen the claim that volcanic rock produced by the human body causes inflammation pain.)"
 In August 2016, a sentence was added to  saying that he "Died at the hands of Michael Phelps, being literally blown out of the water by the greatest American since Abraham Lincoln" after Phelps won the gold medal for 200-meter butterfly at the 2016 Summer Olympics. This particular instance of Wikipedia vandalism attracted moderate media attention.
 On 25 April 2018, various pages related to American video game director Todd Howard were vandalized after a post went viral on Tumblr stating that his page would no longer be semi-protected as of said date. Although Howard's page had its protection extended, a massive raid campaign vandalized many related pages. These included "" (the most popular game he worked on), "" (his hometown), and "" (after a Wikipedia administrator who reversed the vandalism).
 On 16 August 2021, a template that was transcluded onto approximately 53,000 pages was replaced with a swastika. The vandalism was reverted five minutes later.

See also 

 Reliability of Wikipedia
Vandalism

Notes

References 

Wikipedia
Vandalism
Wikipedia reliability
Wikipedia vandalism